Pyar Yay Aine is a Burmese drama television series. It aired on MRTV-4, from November 21, 2018 to January 18, 2019, on Mondays to Fridays at 20:45 for 42 episodes.

Cast

Main
 Aung Yay Chan as Ko Tin Phay
 May Mi Ko Ko as Myaing, Nwe Thway Myaing, Mona
 Myat Thu Thu as Mya Nyo
 Shin Mway La as Phay Myaing

Supporting
 Phone Shein Khant as Ko Lin Maung
 Phyo Yazar Naing as Ko Hla Oo
 Wyne Shwe Yi as Sein
 Han Na Lar as Dr. Irene
 Hein Min Thu as Richart
 May Sue Maung as Shwe Moe Yar
 Kaung Sit Thway as Ko Kyaw Myint
 Zin Wine as Bagyi Mhoon
 May Thinzar Oo as Daw Khin Thandar
 Zaw Oo as U Htun Hla Aung
 Hla Myo Thinzar Nwe as Daw Khin Mar Lar

Award

References

Burmese television series
MRTV (TV network) original programming